Andrei Aleksandrovich Utitskikh (born 12 January 1986) is a former Russian professional football player.

Club career
He made his debut for PFC CSKA Moscow on 20 September 2006 in a Russian Cup game against FC Mordovia Saransk.

He played 5 seasons in the Russian Football National League for 5 different clubs.

External links
 
 

1986 births
People from Novorossiysk
Living people
Russian footballers
Association football defenders
FC Chernomorets Novorossiysk players
PFC CSKA Moscow players
FC Sodovik Sterlitamak players
FC KAMAZ Naberezhnye Chelny players
FC Metallurg Lipetsk players
FC MVD Rossii Moscow players
Sportspeople from Krasnodar Krai